Angus was a constituency of the Scottish Parliament (Holyrood). It elected one Member of the Scottish Parliament (MSP) by the first past the post method of election. Also, however, it was one of nine constituencies in the North East Scotland electoral region, which elects seven additional members, in addition to nine constituency MSPs, to produce a form of proportional representation for the region as a whole.

From the Scottish Parliament election, 2011, the Angus council area was covered by two separate constituencies; Angus North and Mearns and Angus South

Electoral region

Until 2011 the other eight constituencies of the North East Scotland region were: Aberdeen Central, Aberdeen North, Aberdeen South, Banff and Buchan, Dundee East, Dundee West, Gordon  and West Aberdeenshire and Kincardine

The region covered the Aberdeenshire council area, the Aberdeen City council area, the Dundee City council area, part of the Angus council area, a small part of the Moray council area and a small part of the Perth and Kinross council area.

Constituency boundaries and council areas
The Angus constituency was created at the same time as the Scottish Parliament, in 1999, with the name and boundaries of an  existing Westminster constituency. In 2005, however, the boundaries of the Westminster (House of Commons) constituency were subject to major alterations.

The Holyrood constituency covered a southern portion of the Angus council area, north-eastern and north-western portions of the Dundee City council area and a small eastern portion of the Perth and Kinross council area. The rest of the Angus council area was covered by the North Tayside constituency. The rest of the City of Dundee area was covered by the Dundee West and Dundee East constituencies, and the rest of the Perth and Kinross area was covered by the North Tayside constituency, the Perth constituency and the Ochil constituency. The North Tayside, Perth and Ochil constituencies were all within the Mid Scotland and Fife electoral region.

Boundary review

Following the First Periodic review of constituencies to the Scottish Parliament, Angus was split into two newly drawn seats in time for the election in 2011. Thus, it became Angus North and Mearns and Angus South.

Member of the Scottish Parliament
The constituency was represented for its entirety by the Scottish National Party MSP Andrew Welsh.

Election results

See also
 Politics of Dundee

References

Scottish Parliament constituencies and regions 1999–2011
1999 establishments in Scotland
Constituencies established in 1999
2011 disestablishments in Scotland
Constituencies disestablished in 2011
Politics of Angus, Scotland
Montrose, Angus
Arbroath
Carnoustie